Augustine of Hippo (13 November 354 – 28 August 430), also known as Saint Augustine, was a theologian and philosopher of Berber origin and the bishop of Hippo Regius in Numidia, Roman North Africa. His writings influenced the development of Western philosophy and Western Christianity, and he is viewed as one of the most important Church Fathers of the Latin Church in the Patristic Period. His many important works include The City of God, On Christian Doctrine, and Confessions.

According to his contemporary, Jerome, Augustine "established anew the ancient Faith". In his youth he was drawn to the eclectic Manichaean faith, and later to the Hellenistic philosophy of Neoplatonism. After his conversion to Christianity and baptism in 386, Augustine developed his own approach to philosophy and theology, accommodating a variety of methods and perspectives. Believing the grace of Christ was indispensable to human freedom, he helped formulate the doctrine of original sin and made significant contributions to the development of just war theory. When the Western Roman Empire began to disintegrate, Augustine imagined the Church as a spiritual City of God, distinct from the material Earthly City. The segment of the Church that adhered to the concept of the Trinity as defined by the Council of Nicaea and the Council of Constantinople closely identified with Augustine's On the Trinity.

Augustine is recognized as a saint in the Catholic Church, the Eastern Orthodox Church, and the Anglican Communion. He is also a preeminent Catholic Doctor of the Church and the patron of the Augustinians. His memorial is celebrated on 28 August, the day of his death. Augustine is the patron saint of brewers, printers, theologians, and a number of cities and dioceses. His thoughts profoundly influenced the medieval worldview. Many Protestants, especially Calvinists and Lutherans, consider him one of the theological fathers of the Protestant Reformation due to his teachings on salvation and divine grace. Protestant Reformers generally, and Martin Luther in particular, held Augustine in preeminence among early Church Fathers. From 1505 to 1521, Luther was a member of the Order of the Augustinian Eremites.

In the East, his teachings are more disputed, and were notably attacked by John Romanides, but other theologians and figures of the Eastern Orthodox Church have shown significant approbation of his writings, chiefly Georges Florovsky. The most controversial doctrine associated with him, the filioque, was rejected by the Eastern Orthodox Church. Other disputed teachings include his views on original sin, the doctrine of grace, and predestination. Though considered to be mistaken on some points, he is still considered a saint and has influenced some Eastern Church Fathers, most notably Gregory Palamas. In the Greek and Russian Orthodox Churches, his feast day is celebrated on 15 June. The historian Diarmaid MacCulloch has written: "Augustine's impact on Western Christian thought can hardly be overstated; only his beloved example, Paul of Tarsus, has been more influential, and Westerners have generally seen Paul through Augustine's eyes."

Life

Background 
Augustine of Hippo, also known as Saint Augustine or Saint Austin, is known by various cognomens throughout the many denominations of the Christian world, including Blessed Augustine and the Doctor of Grace.

Hippo Regius, where Augustine was the bishop, was in modern-day Annaba, Algeria.

Childhood and education 

Augustine was born in 354 in the municipium of Thagaste (now Souk Ahras, Algeria) in the Roman province of Numidia. His mother, Monica or Monnica, was a devout Christian; his father Patricius was a pagan who converted to Christianity on his deathbed. He had a brother named Navigius and a sister whose name is lost but is conventionally remembered as Perpetua.

Scholars generally agree that Augustine and his family were Berbers, an ethnic group indigenous to North Africa, but were heavily Romanized, speaking only Latin at home as a matter of pride and dignity. In his writings, Augustine leaves some information as to the consciousness of his African heritage, at least geographically and perhaps ethnically. For example, he refers to Apuleius as "the most notorious of us Africans," to Ponticianus as "a country man of ours, insofar as being African," and to Faustus of Mileve as "an African Gentleman".

Augustine's family name, Aurelius, suggests his father's ancestors were freedmen of the gens Aurelia given full Roman citizenship by the Edict of Caracalla in 212. Augustine's family had been Roman, from a legal standpoint, for at least a century when he was born. It is assumed that his mother, Monica, was of Berber origin, on the basis of her name, but as his family were honestiores, an upper class of citizens known as honorable men, Augustine's first language was likely Latin.

There he became familiar with Latin literature, as well as pagan beliefs and practices. His first insight into the nature of sin occurred when he and a number of friends stole fruit they did not want from a neighborhood garden. He tells this story in his autobiography, Confessions. He remembers he stole the fruit, not because he was hungry, but because "it was not permitted." His very nature, he says, was flawed. "It was foul, and I loved it. I loved my own error—not that for which I erred, but the error itself." From this incident he concluded the human person is naturally inclined to sin, and in need of the grace of Christ.

At the age of 17, through the generosity of his fellow citizen Romanianus, Augustine went to Carthage to continue his education in rhetoric, though it was above the financial means of his family. In spite of the good warnings of his mother, as a youth Augustine lived a hedonistic lifestyle for a time, associating with young men who boasted of their sexual exploits. The need to gain their acceptance encouraged inexperienced boys like Augustine to seek or make up stories about sexual experiences. Despite multiple claims to the contrary, it has been suggested that Augustine's actual sexual experiences were likely with members of the opposite sex only.

It was while he was a student in Carthage that he read Cicero's dialogue Hortensius (now lost), which he described as leaving a lasting impression, enkindling in his heart the love of wisdom and a great thirst for truth. It started his interest in philosophy. Although raised Christian, Augustine became a Manichaean, much to his mother's chagrin.

At about the age of 17, Augustine began a relationship with a young woman in Carthage. Though his mother wanted him to marry a person of his class, the woman remained his lover. He was warned by his mother to avoid fornication (sex outside marriage), but Augustine persisted in the relationship for over fifteen years, and the woman gave birth to his son Adeodatus (372–388), which means "Gift from God", who was viewed as extremely intelligent by his contemporaries. In 385, Augustine ended his relationship with his lover in order to prepare to marry a teenaged heiress. By the time he was able to marry her, however, he had decided to become a Christian priest and the marriage did not happen.

Augustine was, from the beginning, a brilliant student, with an eager intellectual curiosity, but he never mastered Greek – his first Greek teacher was a brutal man who constantly beat his students, and Augustine rebelled and refused to study. By the time he realized he needed to know Greek, it was too late; and although he acquired a smattering of the language, he was never eloquent with it. He did however, become a master of Latin.

Move to Carthage, Rome, and Milan 

Augustine taught grammar at Thagaste during 373 and 374. The following year he moved to Carthage to conduct a school of rhetoric and remained there for the next nine years. Disturbed by unruly students in Carthage, he moved to establish a school in Rome, where he believed the best and brightest rhetoricians practiced, in 383. However, Augustine was disappointed with the apathetic reception. It was the custom for students to pay their fees to the professor on the last day of the term, and many students attended faithfully all term, and then did not pay.

Manichaean friends introduced him to the prefect of the City of Rome, Symmachus, who had been asked by the imperial court at Milan to provide a rhetoric professor. Augustine won the job and headed north to take his position in Milan in late 384. Thirty years old, he had won the most visible academic position in the Latin world at a time when such posts gave ready access to political careers.

Although Augustine spent ten years as a Manichaean, he was never an initiate or "elect", but an "auditor", the lowest level in this religion's hierarchy. While still at Carthage a disappointing meeting with the Manichaean bishop, Faustus of Mileve, a key exponent of Manichaean theology, started Augustine's scepticism of Manichaeanism. In Rome, he reportedly turned away from Manichaeanism, embracing the scepticism of the New Academy movement. Because of his education, Augustine had great rhetorical prowess and was very knowledgeable of the philosophies behind many faiths. At Milan, his mother's religiosity, Augustine's own studies in Neoplatonism, and his friend Simplicianus all urged him towards Christianity. This was shortly after the Roman emperor Theodosius I declared Christianity to be the only legitimate religion for the Roman Empire on 27 February 380 by the Edict of Thessalonica and then issued a decree of death for all Manichaean monks in 382. Initially Augustine was not strongly influenced by Christianity and its ideologies, but after coming in contact with Ambrose of Milan, Augustine reevaluated himself and was forever changed.

Augustine arrived in Milan and visited Ambrose, having heard of his reputation as an orator. Like Augustine, Ambrose was a master of rhetoric, but older and more experienced. Soon, their relationship grew, as Augustine wrote, "And I began to love him, of course, not at the first as a teacher of the truth, for I had entirely despaired of finding that in thy Church—but as a friendly man." Augustine was very much influenced by Ambrose, even more than by his own mother and others he admired. In his Confessions, Augustine states, "That man of God received me as a father would, and welcomed my coming as a good bishop should." Ambrose adopted Augustine as a spiritual son after the death of Augustine's father.

Augustine's mother had followed him to Milan and arranged a respectable marriage for him. Although Augustine acquiesced, he had to dismiss his concubine and grieved for having forsaken his lover. He wrote, "My mistress being torn from my side as an impediment to my marriage, my heart, which clave to her, was racked, and wounded, and bleeding." Augustine confessed he had not been a lover of wedlock so much as a slave of lust, so he procured another concubine since he had to wait two years until his fiancée came of age. However, his emotional wound was not healed. It was during this period that he uttered his famously insincere prayer, "Grant me chastity and continence, but not yet."

There is evidence Augustine may have considered this former relationship to be equivalent to marriage. In his Confessions, he admitted the experience eventually produced a decreased sensitivity to pain. Augustine eventually broke off his engagement to his eleven-year-old fiancée, but never renewed his relationship with either of his concubines. Alypius of Thagaste steered Augustine away from marriage, saying they could not live a life together in the love of wisdom if he married. Augustine looked back years later on the life at Cassiciacum, a villa outside of Milan where he gathered with his followers, and described it as Christianae vitae otium – the leisure of Christian life.

Conversion to Christianity and priesthood 

In late August of 386, at the age of 31, having heard of Ponticianus's and his friends' first reading of the life of Anthony of the Desert, Augustine converted to Christianity. As Augustine later told it, his conversion was prompted by hearing a child's voice say "take up and read". Resorting to the sortes biblicae, he opened a book of St. Paul's writings (codex apostoli, 8.12.29) at random and read Romans 13: 13–14: Not in rioting and drunkenness, not in chambering and wantonness, not in strife and envying, but put on the Lord Jesus Christ, and make no provision for the flesh to fulfill the lusts thereof.

He later wrote an account of his conversion in his Confessions, which has since become a classic of Christian theology and a key text in the history of autobiography. This work is an outpouring of thanksgiving and penitence. Although it is written as an account of his life, the Confessions also talks about the nature of time, causality, free will, and other important philosophical topics. The following is taken from that work:

Ambrose baptized Augustine and his son Adeodatus, in Milan on Easter Vigil, 24–25 April 387. A year later, in 388, Augustine completed his apology On the Holiness of the Catholic Church. That year, also, Adeodatus and Augustine returned home to Africa. Augustine's mother Monica died at Ostia, Italy, as they prepared to embark for Africa. Upon their arrival, they began a life of aristocratic leisure at Augustine's family's property. Soon after, Adeodatus, too, died. Augustine then sold his patrimony and gave the money to the poor. He only kept the family house, which he converted into a monastic foundation for himself and a group of friends. Furthermore, while he was known for his major contributions regarding Christian rhetoric, another major contribution was his preaching style.

After converting to Christianity, Augustine turned against his profession as a rhetoric professor in order to devote more time to preaching. In 391 Augustine was ordained a priest in Hippo Regius (now Annaba), in Algeria.  He was especially interested in discovering how his previous rhetorical training in Italian schools would help the Christian Church achieve its objective of discovering and teaching the different scriptures in the Bible. He became a famous preacher (more than 350 preserved sermons are believed to be authentic), and was noted for combating the Manichaean religion, to which he had formerly adhered. He preached around 6,000 to 10,000 sermons when he was alive; however, there are only around 500 sermons that are accessible today. When Augustine preached his sermons, they were recorded by stenographers. Some of his sermons would last over one hour and he would preach multiple times throughout a given week. When talking to his audience, he would stand on an elevated platform; however, he would walk towards the audience during his sermons. When he was preaching, he used a variety of rhetorical devices that included analogies, word pictures, similes, metaphors, repetition, and antithesis when trying to explain more about the Bible. In addition, he used questions and rhymes when talking about the differences between people's life on Earth and Heaven as seen in one of his sermons that was preached in 412 AD. Augustine believed that the preachers' ultimate goal is to ensure the salvation of their audience.

In 395, he was made coadjutor Bishop of Hippo and became full Bishop shortly thereafter, hence the name "Augustine of Hippo"; and he gave his property to the church of Thagaste. He remained in that position until his death in 430. Bishops were the only individuals allowed to preach when he was alive and he scheduled time to preach after being ordained despite a busy schedule made up of preparing sermons and preaching at other churches besides his own. When serving as the Bishop of Hippo, his goal was to minister to individuals in his congregation and he would choose the passages that the church planned to read every week. As bishop, he believed that it was his job to interpret the work of the Bible. He wrote his autobiographical Confessions in 397–398. His work The City of God was written to console his fellow Christians shortly after the Visigoths had sacked Rome in 410. Augustine worked tirelessly to convince the people of Hippo to convert to Christianity. Though he had left his monastery, he continued to lead a monastic life in the episcopal residence.

Much of Augustine's later life was recorded by his friend Possidius, bishop of Calama (present-day Guelma, Algeria), in his Sancti Augustini Vita. During this latter part of Augustine's life, he helped lead a large community of Christians against different political and religious factors which had major influence on his writings. Possidius admired Augustine as a man of powerful intellect and a stirring orator who took every opportunity to defend Christianity against its detractors. Possidius also described Augustine's personal traits in detail, drawing a portrait of a man who ate sparingly, worked tirelessly, despised gossip, shunned the temptations of the flesh, and exercised prudence in the financial stewardship of his see.

Death and sainthood 
Shortly before Augustine's death, the Vandals, a Germanic tribe that had converted to Arianism, invaded Roman Africa. The Vandals besieged Hippo in the spring of 430, when Augustine entered his final illness. According to Possidius, one of the few miracles attributed to Augustine, the healing of an ill man, took place during the siege. Augustine has been cited to have excommunicated himself upon the approach of his death in an act of public penance and solidarity with sinners.  Spending his final days in prayer and repentance, he requested the penitential Psalms of David be hung on his walls so he could read them and upon which led him to "[weep] freely and constantly" according to Posiddius' biography. He directed the library of the church in Hippo and all the books therein should be carefully preserved. He died on 28 August 430. Shortly after his death, the Vandals lifted the siege of Hippo, but they returned soon after and burned the city. They destroyed all but Augustine's cathedral and library, which they left untouched.

Augustine was canonized by popular acclaim, and later recognized as a Doctor of the Church in 1298 by Pope Boniface VIII. His feast day is 28 August, the day on which he died. He is considered the patron saint of brewers, printers, theologians, and a number of cities and dioceses. He is invoked against sore eyes.

Augustine is remembered in the Church of England's calendar of saints with a lesser festival on 28 August.

Relics 

According to Bede's True Martyrology, Augustine's body was later translated or moved to Cagliari, Sardinia, by the Catholic bishops expelled from North Africa by Huneric. Around 720, his remains were transported again by Peter, bishop of Pavia and uncle of the Lombard king Liutprand, to the church of San Pietro in Ciel d'Oro in Pavia, in order to save them from frequent coastal raids by Saracens. In January 1327, Pope John XXII issued the papal bull Veneranda Santorum Patrum, in which he appointed the Augustinians guardians of the tomb of Augustine (called Arca), which was remade in 1362 and elaborately carved with bas-reliefs of scenes from Augustine's life.

In October 1695, some workmen in the Church of San Pietro in Ciel d'Oro in Pavia discovered a marble box containing human bones (including part of a skull). A dispute arose between the Augustinian hermits (Order of Saint Augustine) and the regular canons (Canons Regular of Saint Augustine) as to whether these were the bones of Augustine. The hermits did not believe so; the canons affirmed they were. Eventually Pope Benedict XIII (1724–1730) directed the Bishop of Pavia, Monsignor Pertusati, to make a determination. The bishop declared that, in his opinion, the bones were those of Saint Augustine.

The Augustinians were expelled from Pavia in 1700, taking refuge in Milan with the relics of Augustine, and the disassembled Arca, which were removed to the cathedral there. San Pietro fell into disrepair, but was finally rebuilt in the 1870s, under the urging of Agostino Gaetano Riboldi, and reconsecrated in 1896 when the relics of Augustine and the shrine were once again reinstalled.

In 1842, a portion of Augustine's right arm (cubitus) was secured from Pavia and returned to Annaba. It now rests in the Saint Augustin Basilica within a glass tube inserted into the arm of a life-size marble statue of the saint.

Views and thought 

Augustine's large contribution of writings covered diverse fields including theology, philosophy and sociology. Along with John Chrysostom, Augustine was among the most prolific scholars of the early church by quantity.

Theology

Christian anthropology 
Augustine was one of the first Christian ancient Latin authors with a very clear vision of theological anthropology. He saw the human being as a perfect unity of soul and body. In his late treatise On Care to Be Had for the Dead, section 5 (420) he exhorted respect for the body on the grounds it belonged to the very nature of the human person. Augustine's favourite figure to describe body-soul unity is marriage: caro tua, coniunx tua – your body is your wife.

Initially, the two elements were in perfect harmony. After the fall of humanity they are now experiencing dramatic combat between one another. They are two categorically different things. The body is a three-dimensional object composed of the four elements, whereas the soul has no spatial dimensions. Soul is a kind of substance, participating in reason, fit for ruling the body.

Augustine was not preoccupied, as Plato and Descartes were, in detailed efforts to explain the metaphysics of the soul-body union. It sufficed for him to admit they are metaphysically distinct: to be a human is to be a composite of soul and body, with the soul superior to the body. The latter statement is grounded in his hierarchical classification of things into those that merely exist, those that exist and live, and those that exist, live, and have intelligence or reason.

Like other Church Fathers such as Athenagoras, Tertullian, Clement of Alexandria and Basil of Caesarea, Augustine "vigorously condemned the practice of induced abortion", and although he disapproved of an abortion during any stage of pregnancy, he made a distinction between early and later abortions. He acknowledged the distinction between "formed" and "unformed" fetuses mentioned in the Septuagint translation of Exodus 21:22–23, which incorrectly translates the word "harm" (from the original Hebrew text) as "form" in the Koine Greek of the Septuagint. His view was based on the Aristotelian distinction "between the fetus before and after its supposed 'vivification. Therefore, he did not classify as murder the abortion of an "unformed" fetus since he thought it could not be known with certainty the fetus had received a soul.

Augustine held that "the timing of the infusion of the soul was a mystery known to God alone". However, he considered procreation as "one of the goods of marriage; abortion figured as a means, along with drugs which cause sterility, of frustrating this good. It lay along a continuum which included infanticide as an instance of 'lustful cruelty' or 'cruel lust.' Augustine called the use of means to avoid the birth of a child an 'evil work:’ a reference to either abortion or contraception or both."

Creation 

In City of God, Augustine rejected both the contemporary ideas of ages (such as those of certain Greeks and Egyptians) that differed from the Church's sacred writings. In The Literal Interpretation of Genesis, Augustine argued that God had created everything in the universe simultaneously and not over a period of six days. He argued the six-day structure of creation presented in the Book of Genesis represents a logical framework, rather than the passage of time in a physical way – it would bear a spiritual, rather than physical, meaning, which is no less literal. One reason for this interpretation is the passage in Sirach 18:1, creavit omnia simul ("He created all things at once"), which Augustine took as proof that the days of Genesis 1 had to be taken non-literalistically. As an additional support for describing the six days of creation as a heuristic device, Augustine thought the actual event of creation would be incomprehensible by humans and therefore needed to be translated.

Augustine also does not envision original sin as causing structural changes in the universe, and even suggests that the bodies of Adam and Eve were already created mortal before the Fall.

Ecclesiology 

Augustine developed his doctrine of the Church principally in reaction to the Donatist sect. He taught there is one Church, but within this Church there are two realities, namely, the visible aspect (the institutional hierarchy, the Catholic sacraments, and the laity) and the invisible (the souls of those in the Church, who are either dead, sinful members or elect predestined for Heaven). The former is the institutional body established by Christ on earth which proclaims salvation and administers the sacraments, while the latter is the invisible body of the elect, made up of genuine believers from all ages, and who are known only to God. The Church, which is visible and societal, will be made up of "wheat" and "tares", that is, good and wicked people (as per Mat. 13:30), until the end of time. This concept countered the Donatist claim that only those in a state of grace were the "true" or "pure" church on earth, and that priests and bishops who were not in a state of grace had no authority or ability to confect the sacraments.

Augustine's ecclesiology was more fully developed in City of God. There he conceives of the church as a heavenly city or kingdom, ruled by love, which will ultimately triumph over all earthly empires which are self-indulgent and ruled by pride. Augustine followed Cyprian in teaching that bishops and priests of the Church are the successors of the Apostles, and their authority in the Church is God-given.

The concept of Church invisible was advocated by Augustine as part of his refutation of the Donatist sect, though he, as other Church Fathers before him, saw the invisible Church and visible Church as one and the same thing, unlike the later Protestant reformers who did not identify the Catholic Church as the true church. He was strongly influenced by the Platonist belief that true reality is invisible and that, if the visible reflects the invisible, it does so only partially and imperfectly (see Theory of Forms). Others question whether Augustine really held to some form of an "invisible true Church" concept.

Eschatology 
Augustine originally believed in premillennialism, namely that Christ would establish a literal 1,000-year kingdom prior to the general resurrection, but later rejected the belief, viewing it as carnal. During the medieval period, the Catholic Church built its system of eschatology on Augustinian amillennalism, where Christ rules the earth spiritually through his triumphant church.

During the Reformation, theologians such as John Calvin accepted amillennialism. Augustine taught that the eternal fate of the soul is determined at death, and that purgatorial fires of the intermediate state purify only those who died in communion with the Church. His teaching provided fuel for later theology.

Mariology 
Although Augustine did not develop an independent Mariology, his statements on Mary surpass in number and depth those of other early writers. Even before the Council of Ephesus, he defended the Ever-Virgin Mary as the Mother of God, believing her to be "full of grace" (following earlier Latin writers such as Jerome) on account of her sexual integrity and innocence. Likewise, he affirmed that the Virgin Mary "conceived as virgin, gave birth as virgin and stayed virgin forever".

Natural knowledge and biblical interpretation 
Augustine took the view that, if a literal interpretation contradicts science and humans' God-given reason, the biblical text should be interpreted metaphorically. While each passage of Scripture has a literal sense, this "literal sense" does not always mean the Scriptures are mere history; at times they are rather an extended metaphor.

Original sin 

Augustine taught that the sin of Adam and Eve was either an act of foolishness (insipientia) followed by pride and disobedience to God or that pride came first. The first couple disobeyed God, who had told them not to eat of the Tree of the knowledge of good and evil (Gen 2:17). The tree was a symbol of the order of creation. Self-centeredness made Adam and Eve eat of it, thus failing to acknowledge and respect the world as it was created by God, with its hierarchy of beings and values.

They would not have fallen into pride and lack of wisdom if Satan had not sown into their senses "the root of evil" (radix Mali). Their nature was wounded by concupiscence or libido, which affected human intelligence and will, as well as affections and desires, including sexual desire. In terms of metaphysics, concupiscence is not a state of being but a bad quality, the privation of good or a wound.

Augustine's understanding of the consequences of original sin and the necessity of redeeming grace was developed in the struggle against Pelagius and his Pelagian disciples, Caelestius and Julian of Eclanum, who had been inspired by Rufinus of Syria, a disciple of Theodore of Mopsuestia. They refused to agree original sin wounded human will and mind, insisting human nature was given the power to act, to speak, and to think when God created it. Human nature cannot lose its moral capacity for doing good, but a person is free to act or not act in a righteous way. Pelagius gave an example of eyes: they have capacity for seeing, but a person can make either good or bad use of it.

Pelagians insisted human affections and desires were not touched by the fall either. Immorality, e.g. fornication, is exclusively a matter of will, i.e. a person does not use natural desires in a proper way. In opposition, Augustine pointed out the apparent disobedience of the flesh to the spirit, and explained it as one of the results of original sin, punishment of Adam and Eve's disobedience to God.

Augustine had served as a "Hearer" for the Manichaeans for about nine years, who taught that the original sin was carnal knowledge. But his struggle to understand the cause of evil in the world started before that, at the age of nineteen. By malum (evil) he understood most of all concupiscence, which he interpreted as a vice dominating people and causing in men and women moral disorder. Agostino Trapè insists Augustine's personal experience cannot be credited for his doctrine about concupiscence. He considers Augustine's marital experience to be quite normal, and even exemplary, aside from the absence of Christian wedding rites. As J. Brachtendorf showed, Augustine used Ciceronian Stoic concept of passions, to interpret Paul's doctrine of universal sin and redemption.

The view that not only human soul but also senses were influenced by the fall of Adam and Eve was prevalent in Augustine's time among the Fathers of the Church. It is clear the reason for Augustine's distancing from the affairs of the flesh was different from that of Plotinus, a Neoplatonist who taught that only through disdain for fleshly desire could one reach the ultimate state of mankind. Augustine taught the redemption, i.e. transformation and purification, of the body in the resurrection.

Some authors perceive Augustine's doctrine as directed against human sexuality and attribute his insistence on continence and devotion to God as coming from Augustine's need to reject his own highly sensual nature as described in the Confessions. Augustine taught that human sexuality has been wounded, together with the whole of human nature, and requires redemption of Christ. That healing is a process realized in conjugal acts. The virtue of continence is achieved thanks to the grace of the sacrament of Christian marriage, which becomes therefore a remedium concupiscentiae – remedy of concupiscence. The redemption of human sexuality will be, however, fully accomplished only in the resurrection of the body.

The sin of Adam is inherited by all human beings. Already in his pre-Pelagian writings, Augustine taught that Original Sin is transmitted to his descendants by concupiscence, which he regarded as the passion of both soul and body, making humanity a massa damnata (mass of perdition, condemned crowd) and much enfeebling, though not destroying, the freedom of the will. Although earlier Christian authors taught the elements of physical death, moral weakness, and a sin propensity within original sin, Augustine was the first to add the concept of inherited guilt (reatus) from Adam whereby an infant was eternally damned at birth.

Although Augustine's anti-Pelagian defense of original sin was confirmed at numerous councils, i.e. Carthage (418), Ephesus (431), Orange (529), Trent (1546) and by popes, i.e. Pope Innocent I (401–417) and Pope Zosimus (417–418), his inherited guilt eternally damning infants was omitted by these councils and popes. Anselm of Canterbury established in his Cur Deus Homo the definition that was followed by the great 13th-century Schoolmen, namely that Original Sin is the "privation of the righteousness which every man ought to possess," thus separating it from concupiscence, with which some of Augustine's disciples had identified it, as later did Luther and Calvin. In 1567, Pope Pius V condemned the identification of Original Sin with concupiscence.

Predestination 

Augustine taught that God orders all things while preserving human freedom. Prior to 396, he believed predestination was based on God's foreknowledge of whether individuals would believe in Christ, that God's grace was "a reward for human assent". Later, in response to Pelagius, Augustine said that the sin of pride consists in assuming "we are the ones who choose God or that God chooses us (in his foreknowledge) because of something worthy in us", and argued that God's grace causes individual act of faith.

Scholars are divided over whether Augustine's teaching implies double predestination, or the belief God chooses some people for damnation as well as some for salvation. Catholic scholars tend to deny he held such a view while some Protestants and secular scholars have held that Augustine did believe in double predestination. About 412, Augustine became the first Christian to understand predestination as a divine unilateral pre-determination of individuals' eternal destinies independently of human choice, although his prior Manichaean sect did teach this concept. Some Protestant theologians, such as Justo L. González and Bengt Hägglund, interpret Augustine's teaching that grace is irresistible, results in conversion, and leads to perseverance.

In On Rebuke and Grace (De correptione et gratia), Augustine wrote: "And what is written, that He wills all men to be saved, while yet all men are not saved, may be understood in many ways, some of which I have mentioned in other writings of mine; but here I will say one thing: He wills all men to be saved, is so said that all the predestinated may be understood by it, because every kind of men is among them."

Speaking of the twins Jacob and Esau, Augustine wrote in his book On the Gift of Perseverance, "[I]t ought to be a most certain fact that the former is of the predestinated, the latter is not."

Sacramental theology 

Also in reaction against the Donatists, Augustine developed a distinction between the "regularity" and "validity" of the sacraments. Regular sacraments are performed by clergy of the Catholic Church, while sacraments performed by schismatics are considered irregular. Nevertheless, the validity of the sacraments do not depend upon the holiness of the priests who perform them (ex opere operato); therefore, irregular sacraments are still accepted as valid provided they are done in the name of Christ and in the manner prescribed by the Church. On this point Augustine departs from the earlier teaching of Cyprian, who taught that converts from schismatic movements must be re-baptised. Augustine taught that sacraments administered outside the Catholic Church, though true sacraments, avail nothing. However, he also stated that baptism, while it does not confer any grace when done outside the Church, does confer grace as soon as one is received into the Catholic Church.

Augustine is said to have held an understanding of the real presence of Christ in the Eucharist, saying that Christ's statement, "This is my body" referred to the bread he carried in his hands, and that Christians must have faith the bread and wine are in fact the body and blood of Christ, despite what they see with their eyes. For instance he stated that "He [Jesus] walked here in the same flesh, and gave us the same flesh to be eaten unto salvation. But no one eats that flesh unless first he adores it; and thus it is discovered how such a footstool of the Lord's feet is adored; and not only do we not sin by adoring, we do sin by not adoring."

John Riggs argued that the Augustin held that Christ is really present in the elements of the Eucharist, but not in a bodily manner, because his body remains in Heaven.

Augustine, in his work On Christian Doctrine, referred to the Eucharist as a "figure" and a "sign".

Against the Pelagians, Augustine strongly stressed the importance of infant baptism. About the question whether baptism is an absolute necessity for salvation, however, Augustine appears to have refined his beliefs during his lifetime, causing some confusion among later theologians about his position. He said in one of his sermons that only the baptized are saved. This belief was shared by many early Christians. However, a passage from his City of God, concerning the Apocalypse, may indicate Augustine did believe in an exception for children born to Christian parents.

Philosophy

Astrology 
Augustine's contemporaries often believed astrology to be an exact and genuine science. Its practitioners were regarded as true men of learning and called mathemathici. Astrology played a prominent part in Manichaean doctrine, and Augustine himself was attracted by their books in his youth, being particularly fascinated by those who claimed to foretell the future. Later, as a bishop, he warned that one should avoid astrologers who combine science and horoscopes. (Augustine's term "mathematici", meaning "astrologers", is sometimes mistranslated as "mathematicians".) According to Augustine, they were not genuine students of Hipparchus or Eratosthenes but "common swindlers".

Epistemology 
Epistemological concerns shaped Augustine's intellectual development. His early dialogues [Contra academicos (386) and De Magistro (389)], both written shortly after his conversion to Christianity, reflect his engagement with sceptical arguments and show the development of his doctrine of divine illumination. The doctrine of illumination claims God plays an active and regular part in human perception  and understanding by illuminating the mind so human beings can recognize intelligible realities God presents (as opposed to God designing the human mind to be reliable consistently, as in, for example, Descartes's idea of clear and distinct perceptions). According to Augustine, illumination is obtainable to all rational minds and is different from other forms of sense perception. It is meant to be an explanation of the conditions required for the mind to have a connection with intelligible entities.

Augustine also posed the problem of other minds throughout different works, most famously perhaps in On the Trinity (VIII.6.9), and developed what has come to be a standard solution: the argument from analogy to other minds. In contrast to Plato and other earlier philosophers, Augustine recognized the centrality of testimony to human knowledge and argued that what others tell us can provide knowledge even if we do not have independent reasons to believe their testimonial reports.

Just war 

Augustine asserted Christians should be pacifists as a personal, philosophical stance. However, peacefulness in the face of a grave wrong that could only be stopped by violence would be a sin. Defence of one's self or others could be a necessity, especially when authorized by a legitimate authority. While not breaking down the conditions necessary for war to be just, Augustine coined the phrase in his work The City of God. In essence, the pursuit of peace must include the option of fighting for its long-term preservation. Such a war could not be pre-emptive, but defensive, to restore peace. Thomas Aquinas, centuries later, used the authority of Augustine's arguments in an attempt to define the conditions under which a war could be just.

Free will 
Included in Augustine's earlier theodicy is the claim God created humans and angels as rational beings possessing free will. Free will was not intended for sin, meaning it is not equally predisposed to both good and evil. A will defiled by sin is not considered as "free" as it once was because it is bound by material things, which could be lost or be difficult to part with, resulting in unhappiness. Sin impairs free will, while grace restores it. Only a will that was once free can be subjected to sin's corruption. After 412, Augustine changed his theology, teaching that humanity had no free will to believe in Christ but only a free will to sin: "I in fact strove on behalf of the free choice of the human 'will,’ but God's grace conquered" (Retract. 2.1).

The early Christians opposed the deterministic views (e.g., fate) of Stoics, Gnostics, and Manichaeans prevalent in the first four centuries. Christians championed the concept of a relational God who interacts with humans rather than a Stoic or Gnostic God who unilaterally foreordained every event (yet Stoics still claimed to teach free will).  Patristics scholar Ken Wilson argues that every early Christian author with extant writings who wrote on the topic prior to Augustine of Hippo (412) advanced human free choice rather than a deterministic God. According to Wilson, Augustine taught traditional free choice until 412, when he reverted to his earlier Manichaean and Stoic deterministic training when battling the Pelagians. Only a few Christians accepted Augustine's view of free will until the Protestant Reformation when both Luther and Calvin embraced Augustine's deterministic teachings wholeheartedly.

The Catholic Church considers Augustine's teaching to be consistent with free will. He often said that anyone can be saved if they wish. While God knows who will and will not be saved, with no possibility for the latter to be saved in their lives, this knowledge represents God's perfect knowledge of how humans will freely choose their destinies.

Sociology, morals and ethics

Natural law 
Augustine was among the earliest to examine the legitimacy of the laws of man, and attempt to define the boundaries of what laws and rights occur naturally, instead of being arbitrarily imposed by mortals. All who have wisdom and conscience, he concludes, are able to use reason to recognize the lex naturalis, natural law. Mortal law should not attempt to force people to do what is right or avoid what is wrong, but simply to remain just. Therefore "an unjust law is no law at all". People are not obligated to obey laws that are unjust, those that their conscience and reason tell them violate natural law and rights.

Slavery 
Augustine led many clergy under his authority at Hippo to free their slaves as "pious and holy" act. He boldly wrote a letter urging the emperor to set up a new law against slave traders and was very much concerned about the sale of children. Christian emperors of his time for 25 years had permitted sale of children, not because they approved of the practice, but as a way of preventing infanticide when parents were unable to care for a child. Augustine noted that the tenant farmers in particular were driven to hire out or to sell their children as a means of survival.

In his book, The City of God, he presents the development of slavery as a product of sin and as contrary to God's divine plan. He wrote that God "did not intend that this rational creature, who was made in his image, should have dominion over anything but the irrational creation – not man over man, but man over the beasts". Thus he wrote that righteous men in primitive times were made shepherds of cattle, not kings over men. "The condition of slavery is the result of sin", he declared. In The City of God, Augustine wrote he felt the existence of slavery was a punishment for the existence of sin, even if an individual enslaved person committed no sin meriting punishment. He wrote: "Slavery is, however, penal, and is appointed by that law which enjoins the preservation of the natural order and forbids its disturbance." Augustine believed slavery did more harm to the slave owner than the enslaved person himself: "the lowly position does as much good to the servant as the proud position does harm to the master." Augustine proposes as a solution to sin a type of cognitive reimagining of one's situation, where slaves "may themselves make their slavery in some sort free, by serving not in crafty fear, but in faithful love," until the end of the world eradicated slavery for good: "until all unrighteousness pass away, and all principality and every human power be brought to nothing, and God be all in all."

Jews 
Against certain Christian movements, some of which rejected the use of Hebrew Scripture, Augustine countered that God had chosen the Jews as a special people, and he considered the scattering of Jewish people by the Roman Empire to be a fulfillment of prophecy. He rejected homicidal attitudes, quoting part of the same prophecy, namely "Slay them not, lest they should at last forget Thy law" (Psalm 59:11). Augustine, who believed Jewish people would be converted to Christianity at "the end of time", argued God had allowed them to survive their dispersion as a warning to Christians; as such, he argued, they should be permitted to dwell in Christian lands. The sentiment sometimes attributed to Augustine that Christians should let the Jews "survive but not thrive" (it is repeated by author James Carroll in his book Constantine's Sword, for example) is apocryphal and is not found in any of his writings.

Sexuality 
For Augustine, the evil of sexual immorality was not in the sexual act itself, but in the emotions that typically accompany it. In On Christian Doctrine Augustine contrasts love, which is enjoyment on account of God, and lust, which is not on account of God. Augustine claims that, following the Fall, sexual lust (concupiscentia) has become necessary for copulation (as required to stimulate male erection), sexual lust is an evil result of the Fall, and therefore, evil must inevitably accompany sexual intercourse (On marriage and concupiscence 1.19). Therefore, following the Fall, even marital sex carried out merely to procreate inevitably perpetuates evil (On marriage and concupiscence 1.27; A Treatise against Two Letters of the Pelagians 2.27). For Augustine, proper love exercises a denial of selfish pleasure and the subjugation of corporeal desire to God. The only way to avoid evil caused by sexual intercourse is to take the "better" way (Confessions 8.2) and abstain from marriage (On marriage and concupiscence 1.31). Sex within marriage is not, however, for Augustine a sin, although necessarily producing the evil of sexual lust. Based on the same logic, Augustine also declared the pious virgins raped during the sack of Rome to be innocent because they did not intend to sin nor enjoy the act.

Before the Fall, Augustine believed sex was a passionless affair, "just like many a laborious work accomplished by the compliant operation of our other limbs, without any lascivious heat", that the seed "might be sown without any shameful lust, the genital members simply obeying the inclination of the will". After the Fall, by contrast, the penis cannot be controlled by mere will, subject instead to both unwanted impotence and involuntary erections: "Sometimes the urge arises unwanted; sometimes, on the other hand, it forsakes the eager lover, and desire grows cold in the body while burning in the mind... It arouses the mind, but it does not follow through what it has begun and arouse the body also" (City of God 14.16).

Augustine censured those who try to prevent the creation of offspring when engaging in sexual relations, saying that though they may be nominally married they are not really, but are using that designation as a cloak for turpitude. When they allow their unwanted children to die of exposure, they unmask their sin. Sometimes they use drugs to produce sterility, or other means to try to destroy the fetus before they are born. Their marriage is not wedlock but debauchery.

Augustine believed Adam and Eve had both already chosen in their hearts to disobey God's command not to eat of the Tree of Knowledge before Eve took the fruit, ate it, and gave it to Adam. Accordingly, Augustine did not believe Adam was any less guilty of sin. Augustine praises women and their role in society and in the Church. In his Tractates on the Gospel of John, Augustine, commenting on the Samaritan woman from John 4:1–42, uses the woman as a figure of the Church in agreement with the New Testament teaching that the Church is the bride of Christ. "Husbands, love your wives, as Christ loved the church and gave himself up for her."

Pedagogy 

Augustine is considered an influential figure in the history of education. A work early in Augustine's writings is De Magistro (On the Teacher), which contains insights about education. His ideas changed as he found better directions or better ways of expressing his ideas. In the last years of his life Augustine wrote his Retractationes (Retractations), reviewing his writings and improving specific texts. Henry Chadwick believes an accurate translation of "retractationes" may be "reconsiderations". Reconsiderations can be seen as an overarching theme of the way Augustine learned. Augustine's understanding of the search for understanding, meaning, and truth as a restless journey leaves room for doubt, development, and change.

Augustine was a strong advocate of critical thinking skills. Because written works were limited during this time, spoken communication of knowledge was very important. His emphasis on the importance of community as a means of learning distinguishes his pedagogy from some others. Augustine believed dialectic is the best means for learning and that this method should serve as a model for learning encounters between teachers and students. Augustine's dialogue writings model the need for lively interactive dialogue among learners.
He recommended adapting educational practices to fit the students' educational backgrounds:
 the student who has been well-educated by knowledgeable teachers;
 the student who has had no education; and
 the student who has had a poor education, but believes himself to be well-educated.

If a student has been well educated in a wide variety of subjects, the teacher must be careful not to repeat what they have already learned, but to challenge the student with material they do not yet know thoroughly. With the student who has had no education, the teacher must be patient, willing to repeat things until the student understands, and sympathetic. Perhaps the most difficult student, however, is the one with an inferior education who believes he understands something when he does not. Augustine stressed the importance of showing this type of student the difference between "having words and having understanding" and of helping the student to remain humble with his acquisition of knowledge.

Under the influence of Bede, Alcuin, and Rabanus Maurus, De catechizandis rudibus came to exercise an important role in the education of clergy at the monastic schools, especially from the eighth century onwards.

Augustine believed students should be given an opportunity to apply learned theories to practical experience. Yet another of Augustine's major contributions to education is his study on the styles of teaching. He claimed there are two basic styles a teacher uses when speaking to the students. The mixed style includes complex and sometimes showy language to help students see the beautiful artistry of the subject they are studying. The grand style is not quite as elegant as the mixed style, but is exciting and heartfelt, with the purpose of igniting the same passion in the students' hearts. Augustine balanced his teaching philosophy with the traditional Bible-based practice of strict discipline.

Augustine knew Latin and Ancient Greek. He had a long correspondence with St Jerome the textual differences existing between the Hebrew Bible and the Greek Septuagint, concluding that the original Greek manuscripts resulted closely similar to the other Hebrew ones, and also that even the differences in the two original versions of the Holy Scripture could enlight its spiritual meaning so as to have been unitarily inspired by God.

Coercion 
Augustine of Hippo had to deal with issues of violence and coercion throughout his entire career due largely to the Donatist-Catholic conflict. He is one of very few authors in Antiquity who ever truly theoretically examined the ideas of religious freedom and coercion. Augustine handled the infliction of punishment and the exercise of power over law-breakers by analyzing these issues in ways similar to modern debates on penal reform.

His teaching on coercion has "embarrassed his modern defenders and vexed his modern detractors," because it is seen as making him appear "to generations of religious liberals as le prince et patriarche de persecuteurs." Yet Brown asserts that, at the same time, Augustine becomes "an eloquent advocate of the ideal of corrective punishment" and reformation of the wrongdoer. Russell says Augustine's theory of coercion "was not crafted from dogma, but in response to a unique historical situation" and is therefore context dependent, while others see it as inconsistent with his other teachings.

The context 
During the Great Persecution, "When Roman soldiers came calling, some of the [Catholic] officials handed over the sacred books, vessels, and other church goods rather than risk legal penalties" over a few objects.  Maureen Tilley says this was a problem by 305, that became a schism by 311, because many of the North African Christians had a long established tradition of a "physicalist approach to religion." The sacred scriptures were not simply books to them, but were the Word of God in physical form, therefore they saw handing over the Bible, and handing over a person to be martyred, as "two sides of the same coin." Those who cooperated with the authorities became known as traditores. The term originally meant one who hands over a physical object, but it came to mean "traitor".

According to Tilley, after the persecution ended, those who had apostatized wanted to return to their positions in the church. The North African Christians, (the rigorists who became known as Donatists), refused to accept them. Catholics were more tolerant and wanted to wipe the slate clean. For the next 75 years, both parties existed, often directly alongside each other, with a double line of bishops for the same cities. Competition for the loyalty of the people included multiple new churches and violence. No one is exactly sure when the Circumcellions and the Donatists allied, but for decades, they fomented protests and street violence, accosted travelers and attacked random Catholics without warning, often doing serious and unprovoked bodily harm such as beating people with clubs, cutting off their hands and feet, and gouging out eyes.

Augustine became coadjutor Bishop of Hippo in 395, and since he believed that conversion must be voluntary, his appeals to the Donatists were verbal.  For several years, he used popular propaganda, debate, personal appeal, General Councils, appeals to the emperor and political pressure to bring the Donatists back into union with the Catholics, but all attempts failed. The harsh realities Augustine faced can be found in his Letter 28 written to bishop Novatus around 416. Donatists had attacked, cut out the tongue and cut off the hands of a Bishop Rogatus who had recently converted to Catholicism.  An unnamed count of Africa had sent his agent with Rogatus, and he too had been attacked; the count was "inclined to pursue the matter." Russell says Augustine demonstrates a "hands on" involvement with the details of his bishopric, but at one point in the letter, he confesses he does not know what to do. "All the issues that plague him are there: stubborn Donatists, Circumcellion violence, the vacillating role of secular officials, the imperative to persuade, and his own trepidations."  The empire responded to the civil unrest with law and its enforcement, and thereafter, Augustine changed his mind on using verbal arguments alone. Instead, he came to support the state's use of coercion. Augustine did not believe the empire's enforcement would "make the Donatists more virtuous" but he did believe it would make them "less vicious."

The theology 
The primary 'proof text' of what Augustine thought concerning coercion is from Letter 93, written in 408, as a reply to the bishop Vincentius, of Cartenna (Mauretania, North Africa). This letter shows that both practical and biblical reasons led Augustine to defend the legitimacy of coercion. He confesses that he changed his mind because of "the ineffectiveness of dialogue and the proven efficacy of laws." He had been worried about false conversions if force was used, but "now," he says, "it seems imperial persecution is working." Many Donatists had converted. "Fear had made them reflect, and made them docile." Augustine continued to assert that coercion could not directly convert someone, but concluded it could make a person ready to be reasoned with.

According to Mar Marcos, Augustine made use of several biblical examples to legitimize coercion, but the primary analogy in Letter 93 and in Letter 185, is the parable of the Great Feast in Luke 14.15–24 and its statement compel them to come in.  Russell says, Augustine uses the Latin term cogo, instead of the compello of the Vulgate, since to Augustine, cogo meant to "gather together" or "collect" and was not simply "compel by physical force."

In 1970, Robert Markus argued that, for Augustine, a degree of external pressure being brought for the purpose of reform was compatible with the exercise of free will.  Russell asserts that Confessions 13 is crucial to understanding Augustine's thought on coercion; using Peter Brown's explanation of Augustine's view of salvation, he explains that Augustine's past, his own sufferings and "conversion through God's pressures," along with his biblical hermeneutics, is what led him to see the value in suffering for discerning truth.  According to Russell, Augustine saw coercion as one among many conversion strategies for forming "a pathway to the inner person."

In Augustine's view, there is such a thing as just and unjust persecution. Augustine explains that when the purpose of persecution is to lovingly correct and instruct, then it becomes discipline and is just. He said the church would discipline its people out of a loving desire to heal them, and that, "once compelled to come in, heretics would gradually give their voluntary assent to the truth of Christian orthodoxy." Frederick H. Russell describes this as "a pastoral strategy in which the church did the persecuting with the dutiful assistance of Roman authorities," adding that it is "a precariously balanced blend of external discipline and inward nurturance."

Augustine placed limits on the use of coercion, recommending fines, imprisonment, banishment, and moderate floggings, preferring beatings with rods which was a common practice in the ecclesial courts. He opposed severity, maiming, and the execution of heretics. While these limits were mostly ignored by Roman authorities, Michael Lamb says that in doing this, "Augustine appropriates republican principles from his Roman predecessors..." and maintains his commitment to liberty, legitimate authority, and the rule of law as a constraint on arbitrary power. He continues to advocate holding authority accountable to prevent domination, but affirms the state's right to act.

Herbert A. Deane, on the other hand, says there is a fundamental inconsistency between Augustine's political thought and "his final position of approval of the use of political and legal weapons to punish religious dissidence" and others have seconded this view. Brown asserts that Augustine's thinking on coercion is more of an attitude than a doctrine, since it is "not in a state of rest," but is instead marked by "a painful and protracted attempt to embrace and resolve tensions."

According to Russell it is possible to see how Augustine himself had evolved from his earlier Confessions to this teaching on coercion and the latter's strong patriarchal nature: "Intellectually, the burden has shifted imperceptibly from discovering the truth to disseminating the truth." The bishops had become the church's elite with their own rationale for acting as "stewards of the truth." Russell points out that Augustine's views are limited to time and place and his own community, but later, others took what he said and applied it outside those parameters in ways Augustine never imagined or intended.

Works 

Augustine was one of the most prolific Latin authors in terms of surviving works, and the list of his works consists of more than one hundred separate titles. They include apologetic works against the heresies of the Arians, Donatists, Manichaeans and Pelagians; texts on Christian doctrine, notably De Doctrina Christiana (On Christian Doctrine); exegetical works such as commentaries on Genesis, the Psalms and Paul's Letter to the Romans; many sermons and letters; and the Retractationes, a review of his earlier works which he wrote near the end of his life.

Apart from those, Augustine is probably best known for his Confessions, which is a personal account of his earlier life, and for De civitate Dei (The City of God, consisting of 22 books), which he wrote to restore the confidence of his fellow Christians, which was badly shaken by the sack of Rome by the Visigoths in 410. His On the Trinity, in which he developed what has become known as the 'psychological analogy' of the Trinity, is also considered to be among his masterpieces, and arguably of more doctrinal importance than the Confessions or the City of God. He also wrote On Free Choice of the Will (De libero arbitrio), addressing why God gives humans free will that can be used for evil.

Legacy 

In both his philosophical and theological reasoning, Augustine was greatly influenced by Stoicism, Platonism and Neoplatonism, particularly by the work of Plotinus, author of the Enneads, probably through the mediation of Porphyry and Victorinus (as Pierre Hadot has argued). Some Neoplatonic concepts are still visible in Augustine's early writings. His early and influential writing on the human will, a central topic in ethics, would become a focus for later philosophers such as Schopenhauer, Kierkegaard, and Nietzsche. He was also influenced by the works of Virgil (known for his teaching on language), and Cicero (known for his teaching on argument).

In philosophy 
Philosopher Bertrand Russell was impressed by Augustine's meditation on the nature of time in the Confessions, comparing it favourably to Kant's version of the view that time is subjective. Catholic theologians generally subscribe to Augustine's belief that God exists outside of time in the "eternal present"; that time only exists within the created universe because only in space is time discernible through motion and change. His meditations on the nature of time are closely linked to his consideration of the human ability of memory. Frances Yates in her 1966 study The Art of Memory argues that a brief passage of the Confessions, 10.8.12, in which Augustine writes of walking up a flight of stairs and entering the vast fields of memory clearly indicates that the ancient Romans were aware of how to use explicit spatial and architectural metaphors as a mnemonic technique for organizing large amounts of information.

Augustine's philosophical method, especially demonstrated in his Confessions, had continuing influence on Continental philosophy throughout the 20th century. His descriptive approach to intentionality, memory, and language as these phenomena are experienced within consciousness and time anticipated and inspired the insights of modern phenomenology and hermeneutics. Edmund Husserl writes: "The analysis of time-consciousness is an age-old crux of descriptive psychology and theory of knowledge. The first thinker to be deeply sensitive to the immense difficulties to be found here was Augustine, who laboured almost to despair over this problem."

Martin Heidegger refers to Augustine's descriptive philosophy at several junctures in his influential work Being and Time. Hannah Arendt began her philosophical writing with a dissertation on Augustine's concept of love, Der Liebesbegriff bei Augustin (1929): "The young Arendt attempted to show that the philosophical basis for vita socialis in Augustine can be understood as residing in neighbourly love, grounded in his understanding of the common origin of humanity."

Jean Bethke Elshtain in Augustine and the Limits of Politics tried to associate Augustine with Arendt in their concept of evil: "Augustine did not see evil as glamorously demonic but rather as absence of good, something which paradoxically is really nothing. Arendt ... envisioned even the extreme evil which produced the Holocaust as merely banal [in Eichmann in Jerusalem]."
Augustine's philosophical legacy continues to influence contemporary critical theory through the contributions and inheritors of these 20th-century figures. Seen from a historical perspective, there are three main perspectives on the political thought of Augustine: first, political Augustinianism; second, Augustinian political theology; and third, Augustinian political theory.

In theology 

Thomas Aquinas was influenced heavily by Augustine. On the topic of original sin, Aquinas proposed a more optimistic view of man than that of Augustine in that his conception leaves to the reason, will, and passions of fallen man their natural powers even after the Fall, without "supernatural gifts". While in his pre-Pelagian writings Augustine taught that Adam's guilt as transmitted to his descendants much enfeebles, though does not destroy, the freedom of their will, Protestant reformers Martin Luther and John Calvin affirmed that Original Sin completely destroyed liberty (see total depravity).

According to Leo Ruickbie, Augustine's arguments against magic, differentiating it from miracle, were crucial in the early Church's fight against paganism and became a central thesis in the later denunciation of witches and witchcraft. According to Professor Deepak Lal, Augustine's vision of the heavenly city has influenced the secular projects and traditions of the Enlightenment, Marxism, Freudianism and eco-fundamentalism. Post-Marxist philosophers Antonio Negri and Michael Hardt rely heavily on Augustine's thought, particularly The City of God, in their book of political philosophy Empire.

Augustine has influenced many modern-day theologians and authors such as John Piper. Hannah Arendt, an influential 20th-century political theorist, wrote her doctoral dissertation in philosophy on Augustine, and continued to rely on his thought throughout her career. Ludwig Wittgenstein extensively quotes Augustine in Philosophical Investigations for his approach to language, both admiringly, and as a sparring partner to develop his own ideas, including an extensive opening passage from the Confessions. Contemporary linguists have argued that Augustine has significantly influenced the thought of Ferdinand de Saussure, who did not 'invent' the modern discipline of semiotics, but rather built upon Aristotelian and Neoplatonic knowledge from the Middle Ages, via an Augustinian connection: "as for the constitution of Saussurian semiotic theory, the importance of the Augustinian thought contribution (correlated to the Stoic one) has also been recognized. Saussure did not do anything but reform an ancient theory in Europe, according to the modern conceptual exigencies."

In his autobiographical book Milestones, Pope Benedict XVI claims Augustine as one of the deepest influences in his thought.

Oratorio, music 
Marc-Antoine Charpentier, Motet "Pour St Augustin mourant", H.419, for 2 voices and contino (1687), and "Pour St Augustin", H.307, for 2 voices and continuo (1670s).

Much of Augustine's conversion is dramatized in the oratorio La conversione di Sant'Agostino (1750) composed by Johann Adolph Hasse. The libretto for this oratorio, written by Duchess Maria Antonia of Bavaria, draws upon the influence of Metastasio (the finished libretto having been edited by him) and is based on an earlier five-act play Idea perfectae conversionis dive Augustinus written by the Jesuit priest Franz Neumayr. In the libretto Augustine's mother Monica is presented as a prominent character that is worried that Augustine might not convert to Christianity. As Dr. Andrea Palent says: Throughout the oratorio Augustine shows his willingness to turn to God, but the burden of the act of conversion weighs heavily on him. This is displayed by Hasse through extended recitative passages.

In popular art 

In his poem "Confessional", Frank Bidart compares the relationship between Augustine and his mother, Saint Monica, to the relationship between the poem's speaker and his mother.

In the 2010 TV miniseries Restless Heart: The Confessions of Saint Augustine, Augustine is played by Matteo Urzia (aged 15), Alessandro Preziosi (aged 25) and Franco Nero (aged 76).

English pop/rock musician, singer and songwriter Sting wrote a song related to Saint Augustine entitled "Saint Augustine in Hell" which was part of his fourth solo studio album Ten Summoner's Tales released in March 1993.

See also 
 Cogito, ergo sum
 Rule of Saint Augustine

References

Notes

Citations

Cited sources

Further reading 

 
 
 
 
 
 
 
 
 
 
 
 
 
 
 
 
 Green, Bradley G. Colin Gunton and the Failure of Augustine: The Theology of Colin Gunton in the Light of Augustine , James Clarke and Co. (2012), 
 
 
 
 
 
 
 
 
 
 Miles, Margaret R. (2012). Augustine and the Fundamentalist's Daughter , Lutterworth Press, .
 
 
 
 
 
 .
 
 
 
 Règle de St. Augustin pour les religieuses de son ordre; et Constitutions de la Congrégation des Religieuses du Verbe-Incarné et du Saint-Sacrament (Lyon: Chez Pierre Guillimin, 1662), pp. 28–29. Cf. later edition published at Lyon (Chez Briday, Libraire,1962), pp. 22–24. English edition, (New York: Schwartz, Kirwin, and Fauss, 1893), pp. 33–35.

External links

General 
 "Complete Works of Saint Augustine (in English)" from Augustinus.it
 "Complete Works of Saint Augustine (in French)" from Abbey Saint Benoît de Port-Valais
 "Complete Works of Saint Augustine (in Spanish)" from Mercaba, Catholic leaders' website
 "Works by Saint Augustine" from CCEL.org
 Works by Augustine at Perseus Digital Library
 
 
 
 "St. Augustine, Bishop and Confessor, Doctor of the Church", Butler's Lives of the Saints
 Augustine of Hippo edited by James J. O'Donnell – texts, translations, introductions, commentaries, etc.
 Augustine's Theory of Knowledge
 "Saint Augustine of Hippo" at the Christian Iconography website
 "The Life of St. Austin, or Augustine, Doctor" from the Caxton translation of the Golden Legend
 David Lindsay: Saint Augustine – Doctor Gratiae
 St. Augustine – A Male Chauvinist?  , Fr. Edmund Hill, OP. Talk given to the Robert Hugh Benson Graduate Society at Fisher House, Cambridge, on 22 November 1994.
 St. Augustine Timeline – Church History Timelines 
 Giovanni Domenico Giulio: Nachtgedanken des heiligen Augustinus. Trier 1843

Bibliography 
 Augustine of Hippo at EarlyChurch.org.uk – extensive bibliography and on-line articles
 Bibliography on St. Augustine – Started by T.J. van Bavel O.S.A., continued at the Augustinian historical Institute in Louvain, Belgium

Works by Augustine 
 
 
 
 
 St. Augustine at the Christian Classics Ethereal Library
 Augustine against Secundinus in English.
 Aurelius Augustinus at "IntraText Digital Library" – texts in several languages, with concordance and frequency list
 Augustinus.it – Latin, Spanish and Italian texts
 Sanctus Augustinus at Documenta Catholica Omnia – Latin
 City of God, Confessions, Enchiridion, Doctrine  audio books
 
 Digitized manuscript created in France between 1275 and 1325 with extract of Augustine of Hippo works at SOMNI
 Expositio Psalmorum beati Augustini – digitized codex created between 1150 and 1175, also known as "Enarrationes in Psalmos. 1–83", at SOMNI
 Aurelii Agustini Hipponae episcopi super loannem librum – digitized codex created in 1481; his sermons about John's Gospel at SOMNI
 Sententiae ex omnibus operibus Divi Augustini decerptae – digitized codex created in 1539; at Library of the Hungarian Academy of Sciences
 Lewis E 19 In epistolam Johannis ad Parthos (Sermons on the first epistle of Saint John) at OPenn
 Lewis E 21 De sermone domini in monte habito (On the sermon on the mount) and other treatises; De superbia (On pride) and other treatises; Expositio dominice orationis (Exposition on the lord's prayer) at OPenn
 Lewis E 22 Enarrationes in psalmos (Expositions on the psalms); Initials (ABC); Prayer at OPenn
 Lewis E 23 Sermons at OPenn
 Lewis E 213 Rule of Saint Augustine; Sermon on Matthew 25:6 at OPenn
 Lehigh Codex 3 Bifolium from De civitate Dei, Book 22 at OPenn

Biography and criticism 
 Order of St Augustine
 Blessed Augustine of Hippo: His Place in the Orthodox Church
 Augustine's World: An Introduction to His Speculative Philosophy by Donald Burt, OSA, member of the Augustinian Order, Villanova University
 Tabula in librum Sancti Augustini De civitate Dei by Robert Kilwardby, digitized manuscript of 1464 at SOMNI

 
354 births
430 deaths
4th-century Berber people
4th-century Christian theologians
4th-century philosophers
4th-century Romans
4th-century Latin writers
5th-century Berber people
5th-century Christian saints
5th-century Christian theologians
5th-century philosophers
5th-century Romans
5th-century Latin writers
African philosophers
Amillennialism
Ancient Roman rhetoricians
Christian anti-Gnosticism
Augustinus
 
Augustinian philosophers
Autobiographers
Berber Christians
Burials at San Pietro in Ciel d'Oro
Christian apologists
Christian ethicists
Church Fathers
Doctors of the Church
Epistemologists
Latin letter writers
Mariology
Neoplatonists
Numidian saints
Rationalists
4th-century bishops in Roman North Africa
Philosophers of war
Saints from Roman Africa (province)
Sermon writers
Systematic theologians
Catholic philosophers
Ancient Roman philosophers
Ancient Roman Christian mystics
5th-century bishops in Roman North Africa
Former Manichaeans
Christian saints
Eastern Orthodox saints
Eastern Catholic saints
Ancient Roman Catholic saints
Anglican saints
Translation theorists
Natural law ethicists
Christian anthropologists